Eric O'Dell (born June 21, 1990) is a Canadian professional ice hockey player. He is currently playing with HC Dynamo Moscow of the Kontinental Hockey League (KHL). O'Dell was originally selected by the Anaheim Ducks in the second round (39th overall) of the 2008 NHL Entry Draft and has played in the National Hockey League with the Winnipeg Jets.

Playing career
O'Dell played four seasons (2007-2011) of major junior hockey in the Ontario Hockey League (OHL), where he scored 100 goals and 107 assists for 207 points in 198 games played. In 2008 O'Dell was selected to play as a member of the gold medal-winning Team Canada at the 2008 IIHF World U18 Championships, and during the 2009–10 season, he was chosen to represent his team at the OHL All-Star Game.

O'Dell made his professional debut in the American Hockey League with the Chicago Wolves during the 2009–10 season. On June 1, 2010, the Atlanta Thrashers signed O'Dell to an entry-level contract.  After the Thrashers relocated at the end of the 2011-12 NHL season, and became the Winnipeg Jets, O'Dell would play three seasons with the St. John's Ice Caps of the AHL.  In the 2013–14 season, O'Dell made his NHL debut, and on January 11, 2014, O'Dell scored his first NHL goal as a member of the Jets against Curtis McElhinney of the Columbus Blue Jackets.

On July 1, 2015, O'Dell left the Jets organization as a free agent and signed a one-year, two-way contract with the Ottawa Senators. O'Dell began the 2015–16 season with affiliate, the Binghamton Senators of the AHL, instantly adding offense to contribute with 37 points in 50 games before on February 27, 2016, the Senators traded O'Dell to the Buffalo Sabres as part of a seven-player deal.

As a free agent in the off-season, on August 9, 2016, O'Dell opted to embark on a career abroad, agreeing to a one-year deal with Russian club, HC Sochi of the KHL.

Following his third year with HC Sochi in the 2018–19 season, O'Dell left as a free agent to sign a one-year contract with fellow Russian club, Metallurg Magnitogorsk, on May 1, 2019. In the following 2019–20 season, O'Dell was unable to replicate his scoring rate with Metallurg, posting 6 goals and 17 points through 46 games.

O'Dell left Metallurg at the conclusion of his contract and signed an optional two-year contract as a free agent to continue in the KHL with HC Sibir Novosibirsk on June 2, 2020. In the following 2020–21 season, O'Dell was limited to just 9 games with Sibir, after sustaining an injury during October which ruled him out for the majority of the campaign.

Having concluded his contract with Sibir Novosibirsk, O'Dell left as a free agent and was signed to a one-year contract to continue in the KHL with HC Dynamo Moscow on July 20, 2021. In the 2021–22 season, O'Dell regained his scoring prowess, registering 13 goals and 32 points through 47 regular season games. He posted 8 points through 7 playoff contests before leaving the club during their conference semifinals against CSKA Moscow due to the 2022 Russian invasion of Ukraine on March 16, 2022.

As a free agent, O'Dell made a surprising return to Dynamo Moscow, agreeing to a one-year contract for the 2022–23 season on July 13, 2022.

International play

In January 2022, O'Dell was selected to play for Team Canada at the 2022 Winter Olympics.

Career statistics

Regular season and playoffs

International

References

External links
 

1990 births
Living people
Anaheim Ducks draft picks
Binghamton Senators players
Canadian ice hockey centres
Chicago Wolves players
HC Dynamo Moscow players
Ice hockey people from Ottawa
Metallurg Magnitogorsk players
Olympic ice hockey players of Canada
Ice hockey players at the 2018 Winter Olympics
Olympic bronze medalists for Canada
Medalists at the 2018 Winter Olympics
Olympic medalists in ice hockey
Rochester Americans players
St. John's IceCaps players
HC Sibir Novosibirsk players
HC Sochi players
Sudbury Wolves players
Winnipeg Jets players
Ice hockey players at the 2022 Winter Olympics